Stanley Frederick Eyre (born 3 February 1944) is an English former professional football player and coach. After retiring from the sport, Eyre became a successful businessman, author, after-dinner speaker and radio pundit. He is the father of former Rochdale manager Steve Eyre.

Career

Playing career
Born in Manchester, Eyre played as a wing half and began his early career as an apprentice at Football League club Manchester City, where he cleaned boots for players including Bert Trautmann and Denis Law, his playing heroes. Eyre was Manchester City's first ever apprentice. Failing to make the grade at Manchester City, he signed with Lincoln City in 1963 and then had a trial with Huddersfield Town before signing for Crewe Alexandra at the start of the 1964–65 season, but he never made a first-team appearance for either team. After leaving Crewe Alexandra in 1965, Eyre played in the English non-League system with a total of twenty clubs, including Oswestry Town, Rossendale United, New Brighton, Ellesmere Port, Radcliffe Borough and Chadderton. Eyre returned to League football briefly during the 1969–70 season with Bradford Park Avenue, making one appearance, before returning to Oswestry Town; he later played for Wigan Athletic.

Coaching career
Eyre worked on the coaching staff of both Bradford Park Avenue and Southport, and had a brief spell as caretaker manager of Wigan Athletic in 1981, winning one game and drawing a second. He was also Assistant Manager of Sheffield United in 1998, as well as being Chief Scout at the same club.

After football
Eyre started his own office supply company, became an after-dinner speaker, and published a book called Kicked into Touch, which had sold over a million copies as of April 2005. One story that Eyre told involved Hungarian player Ferenc Puskás; on holiday in Australia, Eyre found himself on the same pitch as Puskás, who was coaching South Melbourne at the time:

As of 2009, Eyre co-commentated on Manchester City matches for BBC Radio Manchester. He was still in the role as of 2011, when he suffered from a 'mystery illness'.

References
General
 
 

Specific

1944 births
Living people
English footballers
English football managers
Manchester City F.C. players
Lincoln City F.C. players
Crewe Alexandra F.C. players
Huddersfield Town A.F.C. players
Oswestry Town F.C. players
Rossendale United F.C. players
New Brighton A.F.C. players
Ellesmere Port Town F.C. players
Radcliffe F.C. players
Chadderton F.C. players
Bradford (Park Avenue) A.F.C. players
Wigan Athletic F.C. players
English Football League players
Wigan Athletic F.C. managers
Sheffield United F.C. non-playing staff
Association football midfielders
Bradford (Park Avenue) A.F.C. non-playing staff
Southport F.C. non-playing staff